Tatria is a genus of tapeworms in the family Amabiliidae. It contains at least 15 known species and is the largest genus in the Amabiliidae family.

Species
Tatria acanthorhyncha (Wedl, 1855) Kowalewski, 1904
Tatria appendiculata Fuhrmann, 1913
Tatria azerbaijanica Matevosyan & Sailov, 1963
Tatria biremis Kowalewski, 1904
Tatria duodecacantha Olsen, 1939
Tatria fimbriata Borgarenko, Spasskaya & Spasskii, 1972
Tatria fuhrmanni Solomon, 1932
Tatria gulyaevi Vasileva, Gibson & Bray, 2003
Tatria incognita Spassky, 1992
Tatria iunii Korpaczewska & Sulgostowska, 1974
Tatria jubilaea Okorokov & Tkachev, 1973
Tatria mathevossianae Okorokov, 1956
Tatria minor Kowalewski, 1904
Tatria octacantha Rees, 1973
Tatria skrjabini Tretiakova, 1948

References

Cestoda genera
Cestoda